GFMS (formally  Gold Fields Mineral Services)  are research and consultancy company for the precious metal markets. Since 2011 they have been part of Thomson Reuters. As well as other commodities, they research gold, silver, platinum, palladium, and copper trading.

History
The consultancy’s core publication is the annual Gold Survey, which began in 1967. Consolidated Gold Fields, a mining conglomerate that was later taken over by Hanson plc in 1989, originally launched the Gold Survey. After the take over, a company was formed the same year to continue the survey.

Between 1994 and 1998, the company was owned by Gold Fields of South Africa.

Between 1998 and 2003, the company was known as Gold Fields Mineral Services Limited. In 1998, members of the research team completed a management buy out of GFMS from GFSA, and the consultancy gained full independence. In 2002, GFMS became an associate member of the London Bullion Market Association.

In August 2011, GFMS was purchased by Thomson Reuters. The execute chairperson Philip Klapwijk left the company.

Business
GFMS analysts present at conferences and seminars on precious metals and commodities. They provide information to the news media.

Their reports include:
 GFMS Gold Mine Economics
 GFMS Copper Mine Economics
 GFMS Société Générale Global Hedge Book Analysis 
 GFMS Société Générale Central Bank Reports
 GFMS Gold Survey (annual)
 World Silver Survey (annual)
 Platinum & Palladium Survey (annual)
 Gold and silver supply/demand benchmark
 GFMS Surveys and Forecasts, and the Mine Economics database (provided via the Thomson Reuters Eikon platform)

Reports
In 2011, GFMS estimated 240 tonnes net sale of gold.

The company estimated that electronic waste recycling increase 14% between 2000 and 2014. In 2016, they report a silver supply deficit.

In March 2017, GFMS reported that India's gold imports had increased to 50 tonnes; 82% higher than 2016.

See also

 Gold as an investment
 Gold exchange-traded fund
 World Gold Council
 Société Générale
 Thomson Reuters

References

External links
Precious Metals IRA Companies Information
Thomson Reuters Eikon for Metal Professionals

Precious metals
Research and analysis firms
Companies established in 1989